Yaopu is a town under the administration of Xixiu District, Anshun City in central Guizhou, People's Republic of China. , it has 7 residential communities and 29 villages under its administration.

References

Towns in Guizhou
Anshun